Music Through a Cheap Transistor is a compilation album by the Northern Irish rock band Therapy?. It was one of the first releases in Universal Records 2007 series of BBC sessions. Originally released as a download only on 26 February 2007, the set was later released on double CD on 13 August 2007.

The album features five different performances by Therapy?, which were recorded between 1991 and 1998 for BBC radio. It includes unique and exclusive versions of some of their greatest hits, alongside live favourites and three previously unreleased tracks: "Pile of Bricks", "The Sweeney" and "Lost Highway" (originally by Hank Williams).

(Aside from the first John Peel Session, the band were on A&M Records when all the featured sessions were recorded, but A&M have since been taken over by Universal Music Group; hence this release.)

"It's very flattering to be in the first batch of artists to have these old sessions made available in their entirety especially in a digital download format. Having existed as scraps on C-90's or as half-forgotten memories, it's brilliant to be able to re-visit so many unique (and one-off) performances and let people see what all the fuss was about..."
Michael McKeegan – Therapy?

Missing sessions 

Most noticeably lacking is a live studio session recorded for the Evening Session on 13 June 1995. The tracks performed were "Loose", "Bad Mother", "Our Love Must Die" and "30 Seconds". The reasons why this session is not included are unknown.
Also not included on this compilation is a studio session recorded for the Rock Show on 1 October 2004. This is due to the compilation being released by Universal Records, as this session was composed entirely of tracks from 2004's Never Apologise Never Explain, which was released by Spitfire Records. The tracks performed were "Rise Up (Make Yourself Well)", "Die Like a Motherfucker", "So Called Life" and "Panic".

Track listing

Disc 1 
 John Peel 15/8/91

 Evening Session 21/11/92

 John Peel 29/11/92

 Friday Rock Show 5/2/93

Disc 2 
 Rock Show 7/1/94

 Evening Session 4/8/95

 Evening Session 18/2/98

Personnel 
Therapy?
Andy Cairns – vocals, guitar
Michael McKeegan – bass
Fyfe Ewing – vocals, drums (tracks 1–23)
Martin McCarrick – cello, guitar, vocals (tracks 20–28)
Graham Hopkins – drums (tracks 24–28)
Technical
Ted De Bono – producer (tracks 1–3)
James Birtwhistle – producer (tracks 4–11)
Martin Colley – producer (tracks 12–15)
Tony Wilson – producer (tracks 16–19)
Miti Adhikari – producer (tracks 20–23)
Paul Allen – producer (tracks 24–28)

References 

Therapy? albums
2007 compilation albums
2007 live albums
BBC Radio recordings
Universal Records compilation albums
Universal Records live albums